Baskerville is a census-designated place in Mecklenburg County, Virginia. The population as of the 2010 Census was 128. The state's Baskerville Correctional Center is nearby, but not within the CDP.

Elm Hill and Eureka are listed on the National Register of Historic Places.

References

Census-designated places in Mecklenburg County, Virginia
Census-designated places in Virginia